John Barbagelata (March 29, 1919 – March 19, 1994) was a San Francisco City Supervisor and 1975 mayoral candidate, when he narrowly lost to George Moscone. He was also the owner of a local real estate firm. As of 2020, he was the last Republican to be elected to the San Francisco Board of Supervisors, in 1973.

Personal life
Barbagelata was a realtor and the founder of Barbagelata Realty Company, still operating in San Francisco's West Portal neighborhood. He had eight children and was a devout Catholic.

Political career
A conservative Catholic businessman, Barbagelata was strongly opposed to the leftist counterculture that had begun to take hold of San Francisco in the late 1960s. Barbagelata advocated for pro-business policies such as lower taxes and minimal government regulation of business, and opposed labor unions, hippies, and leftist radicals, which made him a target for various leftist militants. He received numerous death threats, a bomb was exploded outside his house, a gun was fired through the windows of his West Portal real estate office, and two mail bombs were sent to his house, eventually requiring 24-hour police and FBI protection for his family.

Barbagelata was first elected to the Board of Supervisors in 1970 on a campaign of fiscal responsibility and lower taxes.

Barbagelata ran for mayor in 1975 against progressive candidate George Moscone, promising low taxes, a crackdown on crime, and a fight against corruption and "irresponsible City spending".  He lost by fewer than 5,000 votes. For the rest of his life, Barbagelata maintained that the Peoples Temple far-left religious cult, led by Jim Jones, committed election fraud in the 1975 election by busing in out-of-town church members to double- and triple-vote for Moscone under the names of dead voters.

He retired from politics in 1978, returning briefly in the late 1980s to promote a successful referendum creating term limits for City Supervisors.

References

1994 deaths
1919 births
20th-century American politicians
20th-century Roman Catholics
American real estate brokers
Catholics from California
California Republicans
San Francisco Board of Supervisors members